The cross-country skiing events at the 2002 Winter Olympics were marred by drug problems.  The winners of three races were disqualified after blood tests showed that three skiers had overly high red blood cell counts indicating the use of darbepoetin, a drug used to treat anemia.  At the time, the drug was not specifically listed in the International Olympic Committee's (IOC) list of banned substances, but the Olympic rules generally prohibit doping of any kind, in accordance with its charter. After two years and several lawsuits in Olympic and Swiss courts, the skiers in question (Johann Mühlegg of Spain, and Larissa Lazutina and Olga Danilova of Russia) were stripped of all their medals from the 2002 Games.

See the external links below for the official IOC press releases containing detailed information of the doping cases and their resolution, including initial, intermediate, and final amended results. This article gives the final medalists as decided on by the IOC in early 2004.

Medal summary

Medal table

Men's events

Women's events

Participating NOCs 
Forty-four nations competed in the cross-country skiing events at Salt Lake City.

See also
Cross-country skiing at the 2002 Winter Paralympics

References

External links
Official Results Book – Cross-country skiing
IOC Announces Annulment of the Results of Larissa Lazutina from the  2002 Salt Lake City Olympic Winter Games and Amends Results Accordingly – IOC press release, 29 June 2003
IOC Executive Board disqualifies Muehlegg and Danilova from the Salt Lake City Games – IOC press release, 28 February 2004

 
2002 Winter Olympics
2002 Winter Olympics events
Olympics
Cross-country skiing competitions in the United States